Microrasbora is a genus of small fishes. The generic name means "small Rasbora", however these are more closely related to the danios than rasboras. They inhabit freshwater in Myanmar and Yunnan, China.

Taxonomy
Microrasbora, until recently, included a number of described species. Microrasbora erythromicron was first shown to be a member of the genus Danio in 1999. This move has been confirmed by numerous studies. Three other species, M. gatesi, M. kubotai, and M. nana were moved to a new genus, Microdevario, leaving Microrasbora rubescens as the only confirmed species in the genus. However, Fang et al. did not comment on the placement of Microrasbora microphthalma.

Species 
Two described species are currently included in this genus:

 Microrasbora microphthalma Y. E. Jiang, X. Y. Chen & J. X. Yang, 2008
 Microrasbora rubescens Annandale, 1918 (red dwarf rasbora)

Species of uncertain affinity:
 Microrasbora cf. rubescens "Thuzari" – Glowlight Rasbora, Flame Red Rasbora; tentatively placed here

References 

 
Freshwater fish genera
Taxa named by Nelson Annandale